Kim Woo-seok (born March 3, 1994), is a South Korean actor under Alien Company. He made his acting debut in 2017. He is known for his roles in Love Playlist, Rookie Cops, Military Prosecutor Doberman and The Forbidden Marriage.

Personal life

Military service 
In January 2023, Kim gave an interview that he might enlist in the mandatory military service this year.

Philanthropy 
In January 2023, Kim donated 35 million won to the Social Welfare Community Chest of Love on the 29th and participated in the Hope 2023 Sharing campaign with his older brother Kim Min-seok.

Filmography

Television series

Web series

Musical theatre

Awards and nominations

References

External links
 Kim Woo-seok at Alien Company

1994 births
Living people
South Korean male television actors
21st-century South Korean male actors
South Korean male web series actors
South Korean male musical theatre actors
Seoul Institute of the Arts alumni